Sphingobacterium composti is a Gram-negative, strictly aerobic, short rod-shaped and non-motile bacterium from the genus of Sphingobacterium which has been isolated from cotton waste compost in Korea.

References

External links
Type strain of Sphingobacterium composti at BacDive -  the Bacterial Diversity Metadatabase
	

Sphingobacteriia
Bacteria described in 2007